Dregeochloa is a genus of African plants in the grass family.

Dregeochloa is most remarkable for the species D. pumila, the only known example of leaf succulence in the entire grass family.

 Species
 Dregeochloa calviniensis Conert - Cape Province
 Dregeochloa pumila (Nees) Conert - Namibia, Cape Province

References

Arundinoideae
Grasses of Africa
Flora of Southern Africa
Grasses of South Africa
Poaceae genera